The 1st Tactical Missile Squadron is an inactive United States Air Force unit.   It was last assigned to the 585th Tactical Missile Group at Bitburg Air Base, West Germany, where it was inactivated on 18 June 1958.

The first predecessor of the squadron is the 881st Bombardment Squadron, a former United States Army Air Forces unit organized in November 1943.  After training in the United States, the 881st deployed to the Pacific Ocean Theater of World War II, where it participated in the strategic bombing campaign against Japan.  It earned two Distinguished Unit Citations before the end of the war.  It returned to the United States in the fall of 1945 and was inactivated at March Field, California in January 1946.

The squadron's second predecessor was established as the 1st Experimental Guided Missiles Squadron, which conducted guided missile testing for the Army Air Forces and United States Air Force from bases in Florida from 1946 through 1950.  It was reactivated the following year and tested cruise missiles, then trained for deployment to Europe with Martin B-61 Matador missiles. It stood alert with its missiles in Germany until it was inactivated in 1958 and transferred its personnel and missiles to the 71st Tactical Missile Squadron

History

World War II

The first predecessor of the unit, the 881st Bombardment Squadron, was activated at Gowen Field, Idaho on 20 November 1943 as one of the four original squadrons of the 500th Bombardment Group.  It initially flew Boeing B-17 Flying Fortress bombers in New Mexico, then trained in Kansas with early model Boeing B-29 Superfortresses, with frequent delays in training due to modifications of the aircraft correcting production deficiencies..  It departed for its combat station in the Pacific in July 1944 after completing training.

The squadron arrived at its combat station, Isely Field, on Saipan in the Mariana Islands in September 1944.  It flew its first combat mission against a submarine base in the Truk Islands on 11 November.  Thirteen days later it participated in the first attack on the Japanese homeland from the Marianas.  Initially, the squadron flew high altitude daylight raids against industrial targets in Japan.  In January 1945, it carried out an attack on the Mitsubishi engine manufacturing plant in Nagoya, for which it was awarded a Distinguished Unit Citation (DUC).

The squadron was briefly diverted from its strategic mission when it struck airfields in Kyushu to support Operation Iceberg, the landings on Okinawa in April 1945.  Beginning in March 1945, Twentieth Air Force changed both its tactics and strategy and the squadron began carrying out nighttime attacks with incendiaries against area targets.  It received its second DUC for attacks on the urban and industrial section of Osaka, feeder industries at Hamamatsu and shipping and rail targets on Kyushu in June 1945. During the closing days of the war, the squadron also dropped propaganda leaflets over the Japanese home islands.

Following V-J Day, the squadron dropped food and supply to prisoners of war in Japan, Korea, China and Taiwan.  The squadron returned to the United States in the fall of 1945 and was inactivated at March Field, California on 17 January 1946.

Missile testing
The squadron's second predecessor was organized as the 1st Experimental Guided Missiles Squadron, one of the original Army Air Forces missile test squadrons, at Eglin Field, Florida in 1946.   At Eglin it was assigned to the 1st Experimental Guided Missiles Group.  It tested air-to-surface missiles.  The 1st Group was inactivated in July 1949, and the squadron was attached to its successor, the 550th Guided Missiles Wing.  In December 1950, the squadron moved with the 550th Wing to Patrick Air Force Base, Florida, but it was not operational at Patrick and was inactivated at the end of the month, when the 550th was replaced by the 4800th Guided Missile Wing.

The squadron was redesignated the 1st Bombardment Squadron, Missile (Light), but was again redesignated the 1st Pilotless Bomber Squadron before being reactivated at Patrick in October 1951.  The unit again experimented with missiles, but this time with cruise missiles, including the Republic-Ford JB-2 and Martin B-61 Matador.  The squadron developed procedures and methods for deployment of tactical nuclear missiles until 1954, when it was transferred to Tactical Air Command.

Missile operations in Europe
The 1st trained until March 1954, when it deployed to United States Air Forces Europe (USAFE) and Bitburg Air Base. It was the first operational United States missile unit. At Bitburg the squadron was equipped with the B-61A Matador. The 1st was redesignated the 1st Tactical Missile Squadron a year later.

As additional Matador squadrons deployed to Germany, USAFE formed the 7382d Guided Missile Group, headquartered at Hahn Air Base. The 1st Tactical Missile Squadron was detached from the 36th Wing, and attached to the new group.  when the 7382d Group was inactivated on 15 September 1956, the 1st Squadron was reassigned to the newly formed 585th Tactical Missile Group at Bitburg, as part of the newly formed 701st Tactical Missile Wing, headquartered at Hahn.  The unit converted from the TM-61A to the TM-61C during that time.  The 1st was inactivated and replaced by the 71st Tactical Missile Squadron, which was simultaneously activated on 18 Jun 1958.

In 1985 the World War II 881st Bombardment Squadron was consolidated with the squadron, but it was not activated.

Lineage
 881st Bombardment Squadron
 Constituted as the 881st Bombardment Squadron, Very Heavy on 19 November 1943
 Activated on 20 November 1943
 Inactivated on 17 January 1946
 Consolidated with the 1st Tactical Missile Squadron as the 1st Tactical Missile Squadron on 18 September 1985

 1st Tactical Missile Squadron
 Constituted as the 1st Experimental Guided Missiles Squadron
 Activated on 6 February 1946
 Redesignated 1st Guided Missiles Squadron (Air to Surface Missile) on 22 July 1949
 Inactivated on 30 December 1950
 Redesignated 1st Bombardment Squadron, Missile (Light) on 13 September 1951
 Redesignated 1st Pilotless Bomber Squadron and activated on 1 October 1951
 Redesignated 1st Tactical Missile Squadron on 14 March 1955
 Inactivated 18 June 1958 
 Consolidated with the 881st Bombardment Squadron on 19 September 1985 (remained inactive)

Assignments
 500th Bombardment Group, 20 November 1943 – 17 January 1946
 1st Experimental Guided Missiles Group: 6 February 1946
 Air Proving Ground: 20 July 1949 (attached to 550th Guided Missiles Wing)
 550th Guided Missiles Wing: 1 August 1950 – 30 December 1950
 6555th Guided Missile Wing (later 6555th Guided Missile Group): 1 October 1951
 Tactical Air Command: 1 January 1954
 Twelfth Air Force: 31 March 1954 (attached to 36th Fighter-Bomber Wing (later 36th Fighter-Day Wing) 31 March 1954, 7382d Guided Missile Group 15 April 1956 – 15 September 1956)
 585th Tactical Missile Group, 15 September 1956 – 18 June 1958

Stations
 Gowen Field, Idaho, 20 November 1943
 Clovis Army Air Field, New Mexico, c. 16 December 1943
 Walker Army Air Field, Kansas, 16 April–23 July 1944
 Isely Field, Saipan, Mariana Islands, 19 September 1944 – 15 November 1945
 March Field, California, 29 November 1945 – 17 January 1946
 Eglin Field (later Eglin Air Force Base), Florida 6 February 1946
 Patrick Air Force Base, Florida, 11 December 1950 – 30 December 1950
 Patrick Air Force Base, Florida, 1 October 1951
 Bitburg Air Base, West Germany, 31 March 1954 – 18 June 1958

Aircraft and missiles
 Boeing B-17 Flying Fortress, 1944
 Boeing B-29 Superfortress, 1944–1945
 Republic-Ford JB-2, 1951
 Martin B-61 (later TM-61) Matador, 1954–1962

Awards and campaigns

See also

 List of United States Air Force missile squadrons
 List of B-29 Superfortress operators
 B-17 Flying Fortress units of the United States Army Air Forces

References

Notes
 Explanatory notes

 Citations

Bibliography

 
 
 
 
 
 
 

001
Military units and formations of the United States in the Cold War
1943 establishments in Idaho
1958 disestablishments in West Germany
Military units and formations established in 1943
Military units and formations disestablished in 1958